Clockwork is the third studio album release by the Spanish thrash metal band Angelus Apatrida.

Track listing
 The Manhattan Project 01:10
 Blast Off 04:23
 Of Men and Tyrants 04:51
 Clockwork 03:57
 Devil Take the Hindmost 04:10
 The Misanthropist 03:55
 Legally Brainwashed 03:18
 Get Out of My Way 04:24
 My Insanity 05:28
 One Side One War 04:38
 Into the Storm 03:33
 National Disgrace 04:11

References

2010 albums
Angelus Apatrida albums